The 2020–21 Missouri Tigers women's basketball team represented the University of Missouri during the 2020–21 NCAA Division I women's basketball season. The Tigers, led by eleventh-year head coach Robin Pingeton, played their home games at Mizzou Arena and competed as members of the Southeastern Conference (SEC). Missouri finished the season 9–13 (5–9 SEC) and received an at-large bid to the 2021 WNIT, where they lost in the first round and a consolation game.

Preseason

SEC media poll
The SEC media poll was released on November 17, 2020, with the Tigers selected to finish in tenth place in the SEC.

Preseason All-SEC teams
The Tigers had one player selected to the preseason all-SEC teams.

Second team

Aijha Blackwell

Schedule

|-
!colspan=9 style=| Non-conference regular season

|-
!colspan=9 style=| SEC regular season

|-
!colspan=9 style=| SEC Tournament

|-
!colspan=12 style=|WNIT

References

Missouri Tigers women's basketball seasons
Missouri
Missouri Tigers
Missouri Tigers
Missouri